Aaron ben Samuel of Hergershausen (1665–) was a Hessian Jewish writer. He is considered to be the first person in Germany to attempt to bring about the use of the vernacular in lieu of the Hebrew in the daily prayers.

He began his career as a small trader or pedlar, later becoming a distiller of brandy for sale in his tavern. In 1709 he published in Frankfurt his Liebliche tefiloh, oder kreftige artznai for guf un neshomoh ('A Lovely Prayer, or a Tonic for Body and Soul'), a volume of prayers and personal supplications in Yiddish. Though not the first Yiddish adaptation of the siddur, the work was original in that it sought to give a literary form to the vernacular version, by amplifying considerably the original text of the prayers. The object of the writer is clearly expressed in the introduction to the book, namely, to bring about the substitution of this Yiddish version for the Hebrew text in those spheres in which Hebrew was no longer understood.

In the early nineteenth century, hundreds of copies of Liebliche tefiloh were found in the attic of a synagogue. In an 1846 article, Rabbi  of Frankfurt claimed that the work had fallen into obscurity because of a ban by the Palatinate Orthodox rabbinate. No evidence of such a ban, however, has been found.

References

External links

1665 births
1730s deaths
Year of death uncertain
18th-century Jews
18th-century translators
18th-century German male writers
18th-century German writers
Translators to Yiddish
Translators from Hebrew
Jewish translators
Writers from Hesse
German brewers